Serbs are a small community in Bulgaria, most of whom are immigrants. Many of them are athletes and businessmen who have expatriated to Bulgaria in the 20th and 21st century.

Population
 According to the National Council for Cooperation on Ethnic and Integration Issues by the Bulgarian Government, there are 313 local Serbs in the country, most of whom are descendants of old political emigrants.
2011 Bulgarian census registered 569 Serbian citizens living permanently in Bulgaria, most of whom are recent economic immigrants.

History

Middle Ages
During the Byzantine rule in Bulgaria, the Serbs invaded Byzantine territory in 1149. Emperor Manuel I Komnenos (1143–1180) forced the rebellious Serbs to vassalage (1150–52) and settled some Serbian POWs around Sofia.

Ottoman times
The village Brakevtsi was settled by Serbs in late Ottoman times, after the local Bulgarian population had emigrated to Bessarabia.

19th century Bulgaria
In the 1880 Bulgarian census, in which native language was registered, 1,894 Serbs were counted with the following Districts having a notable number of Serbian-speakers:
Vidin District: 1,260, 1.2% of the total
Kula Subdistrict: 1,083, 3.5%; Brakevtsi, (today in Serbia), Brakevtsi municipality: 1,067 (Serb majority, the only such settlement in Bulgaria). In 1919 Brakevtsi was ceded to Serbia.
Vidin Subdistrict: 165, 0.4%
Sofia District: 258, 0.2%
Sofia Subdistrict: 243, 0.5%

Organizations
In 1999, an organization of "Bulgarian Serbs" was formed, but broke up soon after that. In 2010 an Association of the Serbs in Bulgaria was set up.

Notable people
Ana-Neda (1323–1324), Empress consort of Bulgaria
Dragana (1371–1395), Empress consort of Bulgaria
Đoko Rosić (1932–2014), Serbia-born Bulgarian actor. An old political emigrant. Serbian father and Bulgarian mother.
Zlatomir Zagorčić (b. 1971), naturalized Bulgarian former footballer, now coach. Played for the Bulgarian national team 1998–2004.
Predrag Pažin (b. 1973), naturalized Bulgarian former footballer, now coach. Played for the Bulgarian national team 2000–2004.
Zoran Janković (b. 1974), naturalized Bulgarian former footballer. Played for the Bulgarian national team 2002–2007.
Ivan Čvorović (b. 1985), naturalized Bulgarian footballer, playing for the Bulgarian national team
Majstor Miro (Майстор Миро), chef.

See also

Bulgarians in Serbia
Bulgarian-Serbian relations
Serb diaspora
Serbs in North Macedonia
Serbs in Romania
Serbs in Greece
Serbs in Albania

References

External links
Radosavljević, Nedeljko. "Симо Соколов и српска емиграција у Бугарској 1883–1886.(документи)." Мешовита грађа 34 (2013): 233–267.

Bulgaria
Bulgarian people of Serbian descent
Ethnic groups in Bulgaria
Bulgaria
Bulgaria
Bulgaria